Mystic Dunes Golf Club is a resort style golf course in Celebration, Florida designed by Gary Koch. Par is 71. The course measures 7012 yards long from the back tees. Its signature hole is the 177 yard par 3 #2, with a waterfall to the left of the green.  The golf club resides on the Mystic Dunes Resort & Golf Club timeshare resort owned by Diamond Resorts International, and was previously known as the Wyndham Palms Resort and Country Club.

Mystic Dunes Golf Club was host to nightly events during the 2017 and 2018 Diamond Resorts Invitational celebrity golf tournament.

Overview

References

External links
Official Site
Course Entry on Golfcourse.com

Golf clubs and courses in Greater Orlando
Buildings and structures in Osceola County, Florida
Tourist attractions in Osceola County, Florida
1998 establishments in Florida
Sports venues completed in 1998
Golf in Orlando, Florida